Senator Brand may refer to:

Charles Hillyer Brand (1861–1933), Georgia State Senate
Charles Brand (congressman) (1871–1966), Ohio State Senate
William H. Brand (1824–1891), New York State Senate

See also
Craig Brandt (born 1968), New Mexico State Senate